High Dependency Unit are a New Zealand psychedelic rock band originating from Dunedin. Forming in 1994, the band was described by BBC DJ and presenter John Peel as "one of the 10 best bands in the world you've never heard of." The band consists of Tristan Dingemans (guitar, vocals), Neil Phillips (guitar, bass) and Constantine Karlis (drums, percussion, synth, samples).

History
The band opened for bands including Mogwai and Shellac.

Prominent audio engineer and longtime fan Steve Albini hosted HDU at his Chicago studio for their 2001 release Fire Works.

Discography

Albums
 Sum of the Few (1996)
 Crosschannel Multitap (1998)
 Fire Works (2001)
 Metamathics (2008)

EPs
 Abstinence:Acrimony (1995)
 Higher (1997)
 Memento Mori (2000)

References

External links
 High Dependency Unit official website
 High Dependency Unit Myspace page
 Listener review of Metamathics

Flying Nun Records artists
Musical groups established in 1995
New Zealand musical trios
New Zealand post-rock groups
Psychedelic rock music groups